This article lists the official squad lists for the 2008 Africa Cup of Nations, held in Ghana in January and February 2008.

Group A

Head coach: Claude Le Roy

Head coach: Robert Nouzaret

Head coach: Henri Michel

Head coach: Arie Schans

Group B

Head coach: Reinhard Fabisch

Head coach: Gérard Gili

Head coach: Jean-François Jodar

Head coach: Berti Vogts

Group C

Head coach: Otto Pfister

Head coach: Hassan Shehata

Head coach:  Mohamed Abdallah

Head coach: Patrick Phiri

Group D

Head coach: Oliveira Gonçalves

Head coach: Henryk Kasperczak, then Lamine N'Diaye

Head coach: Carlos Alberto Parreira

Head coach: Roger Lemerre

References

External links
football African Nations Cup results

Africa Cup of Nations squads